Wilson Trailer Company is an Iowa corporation, independent (privately held) cargo trailer manufacturer headquartered in Sioux City. Wilson manufactures (i) industrial road transport trailers for livestock, grain, and the like – flatbed and gooseneck design, aluminum and custom – and (ii) trailer-equipment and accessories such as self-unloading belt conveyors.

History
Frank Taplin Wilson founded the company in 1883 as a small wagon and carriage shop in the Huron territory, South Dakota.  In 1890, he moved to Sioux City, Iowa, to join his brother, George Washington Wilson (1859–1913). Wilson Trailer is still family operated by the fourth and fifth generations.

Big band history – sleeper buses 
In the late 1930s, Wilson began manufacturing sleeper buses for big bands, notably territory bands. Lawrence Welk has speculated that he was the first to design and use a sleeper bus.

Production plants
Wilson Trailer has six facilities:
 Sioux City, Iowa — headquarters
 Yankton, South Dakota — modern production facility
 Moberly, Missouri — modern production facility
 Lennox, South Dakota — modern production facility
 Sioux City, Iowa — modern production facility
 Sioux City, Iowa — corporate parts and service center

External links
 Wilson Trailer Company official site

Bibliography

Notes

References 

 

 .

Primary references 

 
 

Sioux City, Iowa
Manufacturing companies based in Iowa
American companies established in 1883
1883 establishments in Dakota Territory